The Atlanta Braves are an American professional baseball team based in the Atlanta metropolitan area. The Braves compete in Major League Baseball (MLB) as a member club of the National League (NL) East division. The Braves were founded in Boston, Massachusetts, in 1871, as the Boston Red Stockings.  After various name changes, the team eventually began operating as the Boston Braves in 1912, which lasted for most of the first half of the 20th century. Then, in 1953, the team moved to Milwaukee, Wisconsin, and became the Milwaukee Braves, followed by their move to Atlanta in 1966. 

The name "Braves" originates from a term for a Native American warrior. They are nicknamed "the Bravos", and often referred to as "America's Team" in reference to the team's games being broadcast nationally on TBS from the 1970s until 2007, giving the team a nationwide fan base.

The Braves and the Chicago Cubs are the National League's two remaining charter franchises.  The team states it is "the oldest continuously operating professional sports franchise in America." 

From 1991 to 2005, the Braves were one of the most successful teams in baseball, winning an unprecedented 14 consecutive division titles, making an MLB record eight consecutive National League Championship Series appearances, and producing one of the greatest pitching rotations in the history of baseball including Hall of Famers Greg Maddux, John Smoltz, and Tom Glavine. Since their debut in the National League in 1876, the franchise has won an MLB record 22 divisional titles, 18 National League pennants, and four World Series championships – in 1914 as the Boston Braves, in 1957 as the Milwaukee Braves, and in 1995 and 2021 as the Atlanta Braves. The Braves are the only Major League Baseball franchise to have won the World Series in three different home cities.

History

Boston (1871–1952)

1871–1913

The Cincinnati Red Stockings, established in 1869 as the first openly all-professional baseball team, voted to dissolve after the 1870 season. Player-manager Harry Wright, with brother George and two other Cincinnati players, then went to Boston, Massachusetts at the invitation of Boston Red Stockings founder Ivers Whitney Adams to form the nucleus of the Boston Red Stockings, a charter member of the National Association of Professional Base Ball Players (NAPBBP).

The original Boston Red Stockings team and its successors can lay claim to being the oldest continuously playing team in American professional sports. The only other team that has been organized as long, the Chicago Cubs, did not play for the two years following the Great Chicago Fire of 1871. Two young players hired away from the Forest City club of Rockford, Illinois, turned out to be the biggest stars during the NAPBBP years: pitcher Al Spalding, founder of Spalding sporting goods, and second baseman Ross Barnes.

Led by the Wright brothers, Barnes, and Spalding, the Red Stockings dominated the National Association, winning four of that league's five championships. The team became one of the National League's charter franchises in 1876, sometimes called the "Red Caps" (as a new Cincinnati Red Stockings club was another charter member).

The Boston Red Caps played in the first game in the history of the National League, on Saturday, April 22, 1876, defeating the Philadelphia Athletics, 6–5.

Although somewhat stripped of talent in the National League's inaugural year, Boston bounced back to win the 1877 and 1878 pennants. The Red Caps/Beaneaters were one of the league's dominant teams during the 19th century, winning a total of eight pennants. For most of that time, their manager was Frank Selee. Boston came to be called the Beaneaters in 1883 while retaining red as the team color. The 1898 team finished 102–47, a club record for wins that would stand for almost a century. Stars of those 1890s Beaneater teams included the "Heavenly Twins", Hugh Duffy and Tommy McCarthy, as well as "Slidin'" Billy Hamilton.

The team was decimated when the American League's new Boston entry set up shop in 1901. Many of the Beaneaters' stars jumped to the new team, which offered contracts that the Beaneaters' owners did not even bother to match. They only managed one winning season from 1900 to 1913 and lost 100 games five times. In 1907, the Beaneaters temporarily eliminated the last bit of red from their stockings because their manager thought the red dye could cause wounds to become infected, as noted in The Sporting News Baseball Guide in the 1940s.

The American League club's owner, Charles Taylor, wasted little time in adopting Red Sox as his team's first official nickname. Up to that point they had been called by the generic "Americans". Media-driven nickname changes to the Doves in 1907 and the Rustlers in 1911 did nothing to change the National League club's luck. The team became the Braves for the first time before the 1912 season. The president of the club, John M. Ward named the club after the owner, James Gaffney. Gaffney was called one of the "braves" of New York City's political machine, Tammany Hall, which used an Indian chief as their symbol.

1914: Miracle

Two years later, the Braves put together one of the most memorable seasons in baseball history. After a dismal 4–18 start, the Braves seemed to be on pace for a last-place finish. On July 4, 1914, the Braves lost both games of a doubleheader to the Brooklyn Dodgers. The consecutive losses put their record at 26–40 and the Braves were in last place, 15 games behind the league-leading New York Giants, who had won the previous three league pennants. After a day off, the Braves started to put together a hot streak, and from July 6 through September 5, the Braves went 41–12. 

On September 7 and 8, the Braves took two of three games from the New York Giants and moved into first place. The Braves tore through September and early October, closing with 25 wins against six losses, while the Giants went 16–16. They were the only team, under the old eight-team league format, to win a pennant after being in last place on the Fourth of July. They were in last place as late as July 18, but were close to the pack, moving into fourth on July 21 and second place on August 12.

Despite their amazing comeback, the Braves entered the World Series as a heavy underdog to Connie Mack's Philadelphia A's. Nevertheless, the Braves swept the Athletics—the first unqualified sweep in the young history of the modern World Series (the 1907 Series had one tied game) to win the world championship. Meanwhile, Johnny Evers won the Chalmers Award.

The Braves played the World Series (as well as the last few games of the 1914 season) at Fenway Park, since their normal home, the South End Grounds, was too small. However, the Braves' success inspired owner Gaffney to build a modern park, Braves Field, which opened in August 1915. It was the largest park in the majors at the time, with 40,000 seats and a very spacious outfield. The park was novel for its time; public transportation brought fans right to the park.

1915–1953
After contending for most of 1915 and 1916, the Braves only twice posted winning records from 1917 to 1932. The lone highlight of those years came when Judge Emil Fuchs bought the team in 1923 to bring his longtime friend, pitching great Christy Mathewson, back into the game. However, Mathewson died in 1925, leaving Fuchs in control of the team.

Fuchs was committed to building a winner, but the damage from the years prior to his arrival took some time to overcome. The Braves finally managed to be competitive in 1933 and 1934 under manager Bill McKechnie, but Fuchs' revenue was severely depleted due to the Great Depression.

Looking for a way to get more fans and more money, Fuchs worked out a deal with the New York Yankees to acquire Babe Ruth, who had started his career with the Red Sox. Fuchs made Ruth team vice president, and promised him a share of the profits. He was also granted the title of assistant manager, and was to be consulted on all of the Braves' deals. Fuchs even suggested that Ruth, who had long had his heart set on managing, could take over as manager once McKechnie stepped down—perhaps as early as 1936.

At first, it appeared that Ruth was the final piece the team needed in 1935. On opening day, he had a hand in all of the Braves' runs in a 4–2 win over the Giants. However, that proved to be the only time the Braves were over .500 all year. Events went downhill quickly. While Ruth could still hit, he could do little else. He could not run, and his fielding was so terrible that three of the Braves' pitchers threatened to go on strike if Ruth were in the lineup. It soon became obvious that he was vice president and assistant manager in name only and Fuchs' promise of a share of team profits was hot air. In fact, Ruth discovered that Fuchs expected him to invest some of his money in the team.

Seeing a franchise in complete disarray, Ruth retired on June 1—only six days after he clouted what turned out to be the last three home runs of his career. He had wanted to quit as early as May 12, but Fuchs wanted him to hang on so he could play in every National League park. The Braves finished 38–115, the worst season in franchise history. Their .248 winning percentage is the second-worst in the modern era and the second-worst in National League history (ahead of the 1899 Cleveland Spiders with a .130 winning percentage).

Fuchs lost control of the team in August 1935, and the new owners tried to change the team's image by renaming it the Boston Bees. This did little to change the team's fortunes. After five uneven years, a new owner, construction magnate Lou Perini, changed the nickname back to the Braves. He immediately set about rebuilding the team. World War II slowed things down a little, but the team rode the pitching of Warren Spahn to impressive seasons in 1946 and 1947.

In 1948, the team won the pennant, behind the pitching of Spahn and Johnny Sain, who won 39 games between them. The remainder of the rotation was so thin that in September, Boston Post writer Gerald Hern wrote this poem about the pair:
First we'll use Spahn
then we'll use Sain
Then an off day
followed by rain
Back will come Spahn
followed by Sain
And followed
we hope
by two days of rain.

The poem received such a wide audience that the sentiment, usually now paraphrased as "Spahn and Sain and pray for rain", entered the baseball vocabulary. However, in the 1948 season, the Braves had the same overall winning percentage as in games that Spahn and Sain started.

The 1948 World Series, which the Braves lost in six games to the Indians, turned out to be the Braves' last hurrah in Boston. In 1950, Sam Jethroe became the team's first African American player, making his major league debut on April 18. Amid four mediocre seasons, attendance steadily dwindled until, on March 13, 1953, Perini, who had recently bought out his original partners, announced he was moving the team to Milwaukee, where the Braves had their top farm club, the Brewers. Milwaukee had long been a possible target for relocation. Bill Veeck had tried to return his St. Louis Browns there earlier the same year (Milwaukee was the original home of that franchise), but his proposal had been voted down by the other American League owners.

Milwaukee (1953–1965)

Milwaukee went wild over the Braves, drawing a then-NL record 1.8 million fans. The Braves finished 92–62 in their first season in Milwaukee. The success of the relocated team showed that baseball could succeed in new markets, and the Philadelphia Athletics, St. Louis Browns, Brooklyn Dodgers, and New York Giants left their hometowns within the next five years.

As the 1950s progressed, the reinvigorated Braves became increasingly competitive. Sluggers Eddie Mathews and Hank Aaron drove the offense (they hit a combined 1,226 home runs as Braves, with 850 of those coming while the franchise was in Milwaukee and 863 coming while they were teammates), often aided by another power hitter, Joe Adcock, while Warren Spahn, Lew Burdette, and Bob Buhl anchored the rotation. The 1956 Braves finished second, only one game behind the Brooklyn Dodgers.

In 1957, the Braves celebrated their first pennant in nine years spearheaded by Aaron's MVP season, as he led the National League in both home runs and RBI. Perhaps the most memorable of his 44 round-trippers that season came on September 23, a two-run walk-off home run that gave the Braves a 4–2 victory over the St. Louis Cardinals and clinched the League championship. The team then went on to its first World Series win in over 40 years, defeating the powerful New York Yankees of Berra, Mantle, and Ford in seven games. One-time Yankee Burdette, the Series MVP, threw three complete-game victories against his former team, giving up only two earned runs.

In 1958, the Braves again won the National League pennant and jumped out to a three games to one lead in the World Series against the New York Yankees once more, thanks in part to the strength of Spahn's and Burdette's pitching. But the Yankees stormed back to take the last three games, in large part to World Series MVP Bob Turley's pitching.

The 1959 season saw the Braves finish the season in a tie with the Los Angeles Dodgers, both with 86–68 records. The Dodgers would go on to defeat the Chicago White Sox in the World Series.

The next six years were up-and-down for the Braves. The 1960 season featured two no-hitters by Burdette and Spahn, and Milwaukee finished seven games behind the Pittsburgh Pirates, who went on to win the World Series that year, in second place, one year after the Braves were on the winning end of the 13-inning near-perfect game of Pirates pitcher Harvey Haddix. The 1961 season saw a drop in the standings for the Braves down to fourth, despite Spahn recording his 300th victory and pitching another no-hitter that year.

Aaron hit 45 home runs in 1962, a Milwaukee career high for him, but this did not translate into wins for the Braves, as they finished fifth. The next season, Aaron again hit 44 home runs and notched 130 RBI, and 42-year-old Warren Spahn was once again the ace of the staff, going 23–7. However, none of the other Braves produced at that level, and the team finished in the "second division", for the first time in its short history in Milwaukee.

The Braves were mediocre as the 1960s began, with an inflated win total fed by the expansion New York Mets and Houston Colt .45s. To this day, the Milwaukee Braves are the only major league team that played more than one season and never had a losing record.

Perini sold the Braves to a Chicago-based group led by William Bartholomay in 1962. Almost immediately Bartholomay started shopping the Braves to a larger television market. Keen to attract them, the fast-growing city of Atlanta, led by Mayor Ivan Allen Jr. constructed a new $18 million, 52,000-seat ballpark in less than one year, Atlanta Stadium, which was officially opened in 1965 in hopes of luring an existing major league baseball and/or NFL/AFL team. After the city failed to lure the Kansas City A's to Atlanta (the A's ultimately moved to Oakland in 1968), the Braves announced their intention to move to Atlanta for the 1965 season. However, an injunction filed in Wisconsin kept the Braves in Milwaukee for one final year. In 1966, the Braves completed the move to Atlanta.

Eddie Mathews is the only Braves player to have played for the organization in all three cities that they have been based in. Mathews played with the Braves for their last season in Boston, the team's entire tenure in Milwaukee, and their first season in Atlanta.

Atlanta (1966–present)

1966–1974

The Braves were a .500 team in their first few years in Atlanta; 85–77 in 1966, 77–85 in 1967, and 81–81 in 1968. The 1967 season was the Braves' first losing season since 1952, their last year in Boston. In 1969, with the onset of divisional play, the Braves won the first-ever National League West Division title, before being swept by the "Miracle Mets" in the National League Championship Series. They would not be a factor during the next decade, posting only two winning seasons between 1970 and 1981 – in some cases, fielding teams as bad as the worst Boston teams.

In the meantime, fans had to be satisfied with the achievements of Hank Aaron. In the relatively hitter-friendly confines and higher-than-average altitude of Atlanta Stadium ("The Launching Pad"), he actually increased his offensive production. Atlanta also produced batting champions in Rico Carty (in 1970) and Ralph Garr (in 1974). In the shadow of Aaron's historical home run pursuit, was the fact that three Atlanta sluggers hit 40 or more home runs in 1973 – Darrell Evans and Davey Johnson along with Aaron.

By the end of the 1973 season, Aaron had hit 713 home runs, one short of Ruth's record. Throughout the winter he received racially motivated death threats, but stood up well under the pressure. On April 4, opening day of the next season, he hit No.714 in Cincinnati, and on April 8, in front of his home fans and a national television audience, he finally beat Ruth's mark with a home run to left-center field off left-hander Al Downing of the Los Angeles Dodgers. Aaron spent most of his career as a Milwaukee and Atlanta Brave before being traded to the Milwaukee Brewers on November 2, 1974.

Ted Turner era

1976–1977: Ted Turner buys the team

In 1976, the team was purchased by media magnate Ted Turner, owner of superstation WTBS, as a means to keep the team (and one of his main programming staples) in Atlanta. The financially strapped Turner used money already paid to the team for their broadcast rights as a down-payment. It was then that Atlanta Stadium was renamed Atlanta–Fulton County Stadium. Turner quickly gained a reputation as a quirky, hands-on baseball owner. On May 11, 1977, Turner appointed himself manager, but because MLB passed a rule in the 1950s barring managers from holding a financial stake in their teams, Turner was ordered to relinquish that position after one game (the Braves lost 2–1 to the Pittsburgh Pirates to bring their losing streak to 17 games).

Turner used the Braves as a major programming draw for his fledgling cable network, making the Braves the first franchise to have a nationwide audience and fan base. WTBS marketed the team as "The Atlanta Braves: America's Team", a nickname that still sticks in some areas of the country, especially the South. Among other things, in 1976 Turner suggested the nickname "Channel" for pitcher Andy Messersmith and jersey number 17, in order to promote the television station that aired Braves games. Major League Baseball quickly nixed the idea.

1978–1990
After three straight losing seasons, Bobby Cox was hired for his first stint as manager for the 1978 season. He promoted 22-year-old slugger Dale Murphy into the starting lineup. Murphy hit 77 home runs over the next three seasons, but he struggled on defense, unable to adeptly play either catcher or first base. In 1980, Murphy was moved to center field and demonstrated excellent range and throwing ability, while the Braves earned their first winning season since 1974. Cox was fired after the 1981 season and replaced with Joe Torre, under whose leadership the Braves attained their first divisional title since 1969. 

Strong performances from Bob Horner, Chris Chambliss, pitcher Phil Niekro, and short relief pitcher Gene Garber helped the Braves, but no Brave was more acclaimed than Murphy, who won both a Most Valuable Player and a Gold Glove award. Murphy also won an MVP award the following season, but the Braves began a period of decline that defined the team throughout the 1980s. Murphy, excelling in defense, hitting, and running, was consistently recognized as one of the league's best players, but the Braves averaged only 65 wins per season between 1985 and 1990. Their lowest point came in 1988, when they lost 106 games. The 1986 season saw the return of Bobby Cox as general manager. Also in 1986, the team stopped using their Indian-themed mascot, Chief Noc-A-Homa.

1991–2005: Division dominance

From 1991 to 2005 the Braves were one of the most consistently winning teams in baseball. The Braves won a record 14 straight division titles, five National League pennants, and one World Series title in 1995. Bobby Cox returned to the dugout as manager in the middle of the 1990 season, replacing Russ Nixon. The Braves finished the year with the worst record in baseball, at 65–97. They traded Dale Murphy to the Philadelphia Phillies after it was clear he was becoming a less dominant player. Pitching coach Leo Mazzone began developing young pitchers Tom Glavine, Steve Avery, and John Smoltz into future stars. That same year, the Braves used the number one overall pick in the 1990 MLB draft to select Chipper Jones, who became one of the best hitters in team history. Perhaps the Braves' most important move was not on the field, but in the front office. Immediately after the season, John Schuerholz was hired away from the Kansas City Royals as general manager.

The following season, Glavine, Avery, and Smoltz would be recognized as the best young pitchers in the league, winning 52 games among them.  Meanwhile, behind position players David Justice, Ron Gant and unexpected league Most Valuable Player and batting champion Terry Pendleton, the Braves overcame a 39–40 start, winning 55 of their final 83 games over the last three months of the season and edging the Los Angeles Dodgers by one game in one of baseball's more memorable playoff races. 

The "Worst to First" Braves, who had not won a divisional title since 1982, captivated the city of Atlanta and the entire southeast during their improbable run to the flag. They defeated the Pittsburgh Pirates in a very tightly contested seven-game NLCS only to lose the World Series, also in seven games, to the Minnesota Twins. The series, considered by many to be one of the greatest ever, was the first time a team that had finished last in its division one year went to the World Series the next; both the Twins and Braves accomplished the feat.

Despite the 1991 World Series loss, the Braves' success would continue. In 1992, the Braves returned to the NLCS and once again defeated the Pirates in seven games, culminating in a dramatic game seven win. Francisco Cabrera's two-out single that scored David Justice and Sid Bream capped a three-run rally in the bottom of the ninth inning that gave the Braves a 3–2 victory. It was the first time in post-season history that the tying and winning runs had scored on a single play in the ninth inning. The Braves lost the World Series to the Toronto Blue Jays, however. 

In 1993, the Braves signed Cy Young Award winning pitcher Greg Maddux from the Chicago Cubs, leading many baseball insiders to declare the team's pitching staff the best in baseball. The 1993 team posted a franchise-best 104 wins after a dramatic pennant race with the San Francisco Giants, who won 103 games. The Braves needed a stunning 55–19 finish to edge out the Giants, who led the Braves by nine games in the standings as late as August 11. However, the Braves fell in the NLCS to the Philadelphia Phillies in six games.

In 1994, in a realignment of the National League's divisions following the 1993 expansion, the Braves moved to the Eastern Division. This realignment was the main cause of the team's heated rivalry with the New York Mets during the mid-to-late 1990s.

The player's strike cut short the 1994 season, prior to the division championships, with the Braves six games behind the Montreal Expos with 48 games left to play.

1995–2005
The Braves returned strong the following strike-shortened (144 games instead of the customary 162) year and beat the Cleveland Indians in the 1995 World Series. This squelched claims by many Braves critics that they were the "Buffalo Bills of Baseball" (January 1996 issue of Beckett Baseball Card Monthly). With this World Series victory, the Braves became the first team in Major League Baseball to win world championships in three different cities.

They had a streak of division titles from 1991 to 2005, three in the Western Division and eleven in the Eastern, interrupted only in 1994 when the strike ended the season early. Pitching was not the only constant in the Braves organization —Cox was the Braves' manager, while Schuerholz remained the team's GM until after the 2007 season when he was promoted to team president. Terry Pendleton finished his playing career elsewhere but returned to the Braves system as the hitting coach.

In October 1996, Time Warner acquired Ted Turner's Turner Broadcasting System and all of its assets, including its cable channels and the Atlanta Braves. Over the next few years, Ted Turner's presence as the owner of the team would diminish.

A 95–67 record in  produced a ninth consecutive division title. However, a sweep by the St. Louis Cardinals in the National League Division Series prevented the Braves from reaching the NL Championship Series.

Liberty Media era

Liberty Media buys the team
In December 2005, team owner Time Warner, which inherited the Braves after purchasing Turner Broadcasting System in 1996, announced it was placing the team for sale. Liberty Media began negotiations to purchase the team.

In February 2007, after more than a year of negotiations, Time Warner agreed to a deal to sell the Braves to Liberty Media, which owned a large amount of stock in Time Warner, pending approval by 75 percent of MLB owners and the Commissioner of Baseball, Bud Selig. The deal included the exchange of the Braves, valued in the deal at $450 million, a hobbyist magazine publishing company, and $980 million cash, for 68.5 million shares of Time Warner stock held by Liberty, worth approximately $1.48 billion. Team President Terry McGuirk anticipated no change in the front office structure, personnel, or day-to-day operations of the Braves, and Liberty did not participate in day-to-day operations. On May 16, 2007, Major League Baseball's owners approved the sale. The Braves are one of only two Major League Baseball teams under majority corporate ownership (and the only NL team with this distinction); the other team is the Toronto Blue Jays (owned by Canadian media conglomerate Rogers Communications).

2010: Cox's final season

The 2010 Braves' season featured an attempt to reclaim a postseason berth for the first time since 2005. The Braves were once again skippered by Bobby Cox, in his 25th and final season managing the team. The Braves started the 2010 season slowly and had a nine-game losing streak in April. Then they had a nine-game winning streak from May 26 through June 3, the Braves longest since 2000 when they won 16 in a row. On May 31, the Atlanta Braves defeated the then-first place Philadelphia Phillies at Turner Field to take sole possession of first place in the National League East standings, a position they had maintained through the middle of August. 

The last time the Atlanta Braves led the NL East on August 1 was in 2005. On July 13, 2010, at the 2010 MLB All-Star Game in Anaheim, Braves catcher Brian McCann was awarded the All-Star Game MVP Award for his clutch two-out, three-run double in the seventh inning to give the National League its first win in the All-Star Game since 1996. He became the first Brave to win the All-Star Game MVP Award since Fred McGriff did so in 1994. The Braves made two deals before the trade deadline to acquire Álex González, Rick Ankiel and Kyle Farnsworth from the Toronto Blue Jays and Kansas City Royals, giving up shortstop Yunel Escobar, pitchers Jo-Jo Reyes and Jesse Chavez, outfielder Gregor Blanco and three minor leaguers. On August 18, 2010, they traded three pitching prospects for first baseman Derrek Lee from the Chicago Cubs. 

On August 22, 2010, against the Chicago Cubs, Mike Minor struck out 12 batters across 6 innings; an Atlanta Braves single game rookie strikeout record. The Braves dropped to second in the NL East in early September, but won the NL Wild Card. They lost to the San Francisco Giants in the National League Division Series in four games. Every game of the series was determined by one run. After the series-clinching victory for the Giants in Game 4, Bobby Cox was given a standing ovation by the fans, also by players and coaches of both the Braves and Giants.

2011: Fredi González takes over

On October 13, 2010, the Braves announced that Fredi González would replace long-time Braves manager Bobby Cox as manager of the team in 2011. The announcement came just two days after the 2010 Braves were eliminated from the postseason. It was also announced that pitching coach Roger McDowell, third-base coach Brian Snitker, and bullpen coach Eddie Pérez would retain their current positions, while former hitting coach Terry Pendleton would replace Glenn Hubbard as the first-base coach and newcomer Carlos Tosca would become the new bench coach. Hubbard and former bench coach Chino Cadahia were not offered positions on the new coaching staff. Larry Parrish was hired as hitting coach on October 29, 2010.

The Braves franchise became the third franchise in MLB history to reach 10,000 wins with their win over the Washington Nationals on July 15, 2011. On July 31, 2011, just sixteen days after registering their 10,000th win, the Florida Marlins defeated the Braves by a score of 3–1, handing the team the 10,000th loss in franchise history. The Braves become only the second team in big league history with 10,000 losses after the Philadelphia Phillies reached the plateau in 2007.

The Braves led the National League Wild Card standings for much of the 2011 season, with the division-rival Philadelphia Phillies in first place in the National League East. The Braves entered the final month of the regular season 25 games above .500 with a record of 80–55 and an -game lead in the Wild Card standings. The nearest team trailing them, the St. Louis Cardinals, who also trailed the National League Central-leading Milwaukee Brewers by  games at the time, were considered a long-shot to gain a spot in the postseason. Just days prior on August 26, the Cardinals found themselves  games behind and in third place. With 27 games to play, the Braves went 9–18 in September to finish the season with a 89–73 record and missed the postseason.

2012: Chipper's last season

In 2012, the Braves began their 138th season after an upsetting end to the 2011 season. On March 22, the Braves announced that third baseman Chipper Jones would retire following the 2012 season after 19 Major League seasons with the team. The Braves also lost many key players through trades or free agency, including pitcher Derek Lowe, shortstop Alex González, and outfielder Nate McLouth. To compensate for this, the team went on to receive many key players such as outfielder Michael Bourn, along with shortstops Tyler Pastornicky and Andrelton Simmons. 

Washington ended up winning their first division title in franchise history, but the Braves remained in first place of the NL wild-card race. Keeping with a new MLB rule for the 2012 season, the top two wild card teams in each league must play each other in a playoff game before entering into the Division Series. The Braves played the St. Louis Cardinals in the first-ever Wild Card Game. The Braves lost the game 6–3, ending their season.

2015–2017: Rebuilding
After a losing season in 2014, the Braves fired general manager Frank Wren, and John Hart replaced him as interim general manager, choosing to only take the title of President of Baseball Operations. The Braves promptly traded Gold Glove Award winner Jason Heyward to the St. Louis Cardinals along with pitcher Jordan Walden for pitchers Shelby Miller and Tyrell Jenkins. By the beginning of the season, the Braves made 11 trades in all.

After a 9–28 start in 2016, Fredi González was fired on May 17 and replaced by Gwinnett Braves' manager Brian Snitker as interim manager. Snitker replaced González once before in the 2006–07 offseason as the Braves third base coach when González left the Braves to manage the Marlins. The Braves finished the season 68–93 and in last place in NL East.
After the 2016 season was over the Braves promoted interim manager Brian Snitker to full-time manager.

2017: Front office changes

On October 2, 2017, John Coppolella resigned as general manager of the Braves amid a Major League Baseball investigation into Atlanta's international signings, having committed what the Braves termed "a breach of MLB rules regarding the international player market". On November 13, 2017, the Braves announced Alex Anthopoulos as the new general manager and executive vice president. John Hart was removed as team president and assumed a senior adviser role with the organization. 

Braves chairman Terry McGuirk apologized to fans "on behalf of the entire Braves family" for the scandal. McGuirk described Anthopoulos as "a man of integrity" and that "he will operate in a way that will make all of our Braves fans proud." On November 17, 2017, the Braves announced that John Hart had stepped down as senior advisor for the organization. Hart said in a statement that "with the hiring of Alex Anthopoulos as general manager, this organization is in great hands."

MLB investigation and penalties
On November 21, 2017, Major League Baseball Commissioner Rob Manfred announced the findings of the MLB investigation into Atlanta's international signings. Manfred ruled that the Braves must forfeit 13 international prospects, including highly touted Kevin Maitan, an infielder from Venezuela who signed for $4.25 million in 2016. The team also forfeited a third-round draft pick in the 2018 draft. Former Braves general manager John Coppolella was placed on baseball's permanently ineligible list.

Additionally, the Braves shall be prohibited from signing any international player for more than $10,000 during the 2019–20 signing period and their international signing bonus pool for the 2020–21 signing period will be reduced by 50%.

2018–2022: Return to the postseason and World Series Title

The Braves introduced a new mascot named Blooper on January 27, 2018 at the Atlanta Braves fan fest. Blooper succeeded the Braves' "Homer of the Brave" mascot after he went into retirement. The Braves began a new streak of NL East division titles in 2018, when they went 90–72. In 2019, their 97–65 record was their best since 2003. However, in neither season did the Braves advance past the Division Series. In the 2020 National League Championship Series against the Dodgers, the Braves led 3–1 before the Dodgers came back to win the series and advance to the World Series. 

The Braves returned to the NLCS in 2021 after beating the Milwaukee Brewers 3–1 in the 2021 NLDS on the heels of a Freddie Freeman game-winning home run in the bottom of the 8th inning in Game 4. With the score tied at 4, Freeman delivered a blast to left center field to give the Braves a 5–4 lead headed to the top of the 9th. After allowing a lead off single to Eduardo Escobar, Will Smith subsequently retired the side in order to secure the Braves berth in the NLCS.

On October 23, 2021, the Braves defeated the Dodgers in the National League Championship Series, a rematch of the 2020 NLCS, in six games to advance to the World Series for the first time since 1999, thereby securing their first pennant in 22 years. They defeated the Houston Astros in six games to win their fourth World Series title.

World Series championships
Over the 120 years since the inception of the World Series (118 total World Series played), the Braves franchise has won a total of four World Series Championships, with at least one in each of the three cities they have played in.

Ballparks

Truist Park

The Atlanta Braves home ballpark has been Truist Park since 2017. Truist Park is located approximately 10 miles (16 km) northwest of downtown Atlanta in the unincorporated community of Cumberland, in Cobb County, Georgia. The team played its home games at Atlanta–Fulton County Stadium from 1966 to 1996, and at Turner Field from 1997 to 2016.  The Braves opened Truist Park on April 14, 2017, with a four-game sweep of the San Diego Padres. The park received positive reviews. Woody Studenmund of the Hardball Times called the park a "gem" saying that he was impressed with "the compact beauty of the stadium and its exciting approach to combining baseball, business and social activities." J.J. Cooper of Baseball America praised the "excellent sight lines for pretty much every seat."

CoolToday Park

Since 2019, the Braves have played spring training games at CoolToday Park in North Port, Florida. The ballpark opened on March 24, 2019, with the Braves' 4-2 win over the Tampa Bay Rays. The Braves left Champion Stadium, their previous Spring Training home near Orlando to reduce travel times and to get closer to other teams' facilities. CoolToday Park also serves as the Braves' year round rehabilitation facility.

Major rivalries

New York Mets

The Braves–Mets rivalry is a rivalry between the two teams, featuring the Braves and the New York Mets as they both play in the National League East.

Although their first major confrontation occurred when the Mets swept the Braves in the 1969 NLCS, en route to their first World Series championship, the first playoff series won by an expansion team (also the first playoff appearance by an expansion team), the rivalry did not become especially heated until the 1994 season when division realignment put both the Mets and the Braves in the NL East division. During this time the Braves became one of the most dominant teams in professional baseball, earning 14 straight division titles through 2005, including five World Series berths, and one World Series championship during the 1995 season. The rivalry remained heated through the early 2000s.

Philadelphia Phillies
While their rivalry with the Philadelphia Phillies lacks the history and hatred of the Mets, it has been the more important one in the last decade. Between 1993 and 2013, the two teams reigned almost exclusively as NL East champions, the exceptions being in 2006, when the Mets won their first division title since 1988 (no division titles were awarded in 1994 due to the player's strike), and in 2012, when the Washington Nationals claimed their first division title since 1981 when playing as the Montreal Expos. The Phillies 1993 championship was also part of a four-year reign of exclusive division championships by the Phillies and the Pittsburgh Pirates, their in-state rivals. 

While rivalries are generally characterized by mutual hatred, the Braves and Phillies deeply respect each other. Each game played (18 games in 2011) is vastly important between these two NL East giants, but at the end of the day, they are very similar organizations.  Overall, the Braves have five more National League East division titles than the Phillies, the Braves having won 16 times since 1995, and holding it for 11 consecutive years from 1995 through 2005. (The Braves also have five NL West titles from 1969 through 1993.)

Uniforms

1966–1967
The Atlanta Braves originally wore the same uniform design from their final years in Milwaukee, save for the red-brimmed navy cap which was changed from a block "M" to a script "A". Both the home and road uniforms have navy piping and the "Braves" script in red with navy trim, along with chest numbers which were also red with navy trim. The "screaming Indian" patch was added on the left sleeve.

1968–1971
During this period navy became the team's primary color, and pinstripes were worn on the home uniform. The chest numbers and piping were removed, with red only used exclusively on the road uniform. The original navy/red cap was only used at home, while an all-navy cap was used on the road. By 1969, the all-navy cap served as the primary, retiring the navy/red cap.

1972–1975
The Braves entered the polyester era with a new look, changing from navy to royal blue while keeping red as a trim color. Home uniforms were white with blue sleeves, while road uniforms were blue with white sleeves. Chest numbers returned with this uniform. Both sleeves contain a feather patch. Caps became royal blue with white panels, along with a lowercase "a" in red with white and blue trim.

1976–1979
The Braves returned to wearing pinstripes and gray uniforms with this set. The home uniform removed the blue sleeves and feather patch, and replaced them with red pinstripes and collar. The road uniform kept the previous template but returned to a gray base with blue sleeves, with the feather patch exclusive only to the left sleeve. The road uniform also featured a script "Atlanta" in front, with the first "a" in lowercase. In 1979, blue player names were added to the road uniform.

1980–1986
The Braves' home uniform again removed the pinstripes and added player names in blue. Collars and sleeves featured red, white and blue stripes. The road uniform was changed to powder blue minus the contrasting sleeve colors and red trim. In 1981, the road uniform was tweaked slightly, adopting the uppercase "A" script on the word "Atlanta". The Braves also wore two all-blue caps: the home cap featured the white "A" script with red trim, while the road cap lacked the red trim on the "A".

1987–present
The Braves updated their uniform set in 1987, returning to buttoned uniforms and belted pants. This design returned to the classic look they wore in the 1950s.

The white home uniform features red and navy piping, the "Braves" script and tomahawk in front, and radially arched (vertically arched until 2005; sewn into a nameplate until 2012) navy letters and red numbers with navy trim at the back. The gray road uniforms are identical to the white home uniforms save for the "Atlanta" script in front.

Initially, the cap worn with both uniforms is the red-brimmed navy cap with the script "A" in front. In 2008, an all-navy cap was introduced and became the primary road cap the following season.

The Braves have had three different versions of their Friday red alternate home uniform. The first uniform, worn from 2005 to 2013, featured navy and white piping, navy "Braves" script and tomahawk in front, and white letters and navy numbers with white trim at the back. It was paired with a navy cap with red brim featuring the alternate "tomahawk A" logo. From 2014 to 2018, the Braves tweaked the uniform; the "Braves" script was now adorned with stars while the tomahawk was removed. The "tomahawk A" cap was also retired. In 2019, the Braves reverted to a variation of the original red alternate uniform minus the white piping.

The cream alternate uniforms were introduced in February 2012 as a tribute to the Braves' first season in Atlanta in 1966. This set is similar to the primary home uniform, but with chest numbers in place of the tomahawk and blue piping minus the red accents. An alternate "crossing tomahawks" logo featuring the team name and foundation date was added to the left sleeve. The Braves quit wearing the cream alternate uniforms after the 2019 season.

The Braves have worn two versions of their alternate navy blue road jerseys. The first iteration was introduced on opening night of the 2008 season against the Washington Nationals, and featured navy lettering. The only red elements on the uniform can be seen on the tomahawk. For 2019, the Braves drastically changed the uniform to feature red lettering, a red tomahawk and silver piping.

Unlike the home uniforms, which are worn based on a schedule, the road uniforms are chosen on game day by the starting pitcher. However, they are also subject to Major League Baseball rules requiring the road team to wear uniforms that contrast with the uniforms worn by the home team. Due to this rule, the gray uniforms are worn when the home team chooses to wear navy blue, and sometimes when the home team chooses to wear black.

Logos

From 1945 to 1955 the Braves primary logo consisted of the head of an Indian warrior. From 1956 to 1965 it was a laughing Indian with a mohawk and one feather in his hair. When the Braves moved to Atlanta in 1966, the "Braves" script was added underneath the laughing Indian. In 1985, the Braves made a small script change to the logo. The Braves modern logo debuted in 1987. The modern logo is the word "Braves" in cursive with a tomahawk below it. In 2018, the Braves made a subtle color change to the primary logo.

Fanbase 
In addition to having strong fan support in the Atlanta metropolitan area and the state of Georgia, the Braves also boast heavy support within the Southeastern United States particularly in states such as Mississippi, Alabama, South Carolina, North Carolina, Tennessee and Florida.

Tomahawk chop

The tomahawk chop was adopted by fans of the Atlanta Braves in 1991. Carolyn King, the Braves organist, had played the "tomahawk song" during most at bats for a few seasons, but it finally caught on with Braves fans when the team started winning. The usage of foam tomahawks led to criticism from Native American groups that it was "demeaning" to them and called for them to be banned. In response, the Braves' public relations director said that it was "a proud expression of unification and family". King, who did not understand the sociopolitical ramifications, approached one of the Native American chiefs who were protesting. The chief told her that leaving her job as an organist would not change anything and that if she left "they'll find someone else to play."

The controversy has persisted since and became national news again during the 2019 National League Division Series. During the series, St. Louis Cardinals relief pitcher and Cherokee Nation member, Ryan Helsley was asked about the chop and chant. Helsley said he found the fans' chanting and arm-motions insulting and that the chop depicts natives "in this kind of caveman-type people way who aren't intellectual." The relief pitcher's comments prompted the Braves to stop handing out foam tomahawks, playing the chop music or showing the chop graphic when the series returned to Atlanta for Game 5. The Braves released a statement saying they would "continue to evaluate how we activate elements of our brand, as well as the overall in-game experience" and that they would continue a "dialogue with those in the Native American community after the postseason concludes." The heads of the Muscogee (Creek) Nation and Cherokee Nation both publicly condemned the chop and chant.

During the off-season, the Braves met with the National Congress of American Indians to start discussing a path forward. In July 2020, the team faced mounting pressure to change their name after the Cleveland Indians and Washington Redskins announced they were discussing brand change. The Braves released a statement announcing that discussions were still ongoing about the chop, but the team name would not be changed.

Achievements

Awards

Team records

Team captains
 Eddie Mathews 1966-67
 Hank Aaron 1969-74
 Bob Horner 1982–1986
 Dale Murphy 1987–1990

Retired numbers

The Braves have retired eleven numbers in the history of the franchise, including most recently Chipper Jones' number 10 in 2013, John Smoltz's number 29 in 2012, Bobby Cox's number 6 in 2011, Tom Glavine's number 47 in 2010, and Greg Maddux's number 31 in 2009. Additionally, Hank Aaron's 44, Dale Murphy's 3, Phil Niekro's 35, Eddie Mathews' 41, Warren Spahn's 21 and Jackie Robinson's 42, which is retired for all of baseball with the exception of Jackie Robinson Day, have also been retired. The color and design of the retired numbers reflect the uniform design at the time the person was on the team, excluding Robinson.

Of the ten Braves whose numbers have been retired, all who are eligible for the National Baseball Hall of Fame have been elected with the exception of Murphy, whose eligibility has expired.

Braves Hall of Fame

Baseball Hall of Famers

Ford C. Frick Award recipients (broadcasters)

Georgia Sports Hall of Fame

Roster

Minor league affiliates

The Atlanta Braves farm system consists of six minor league affiliates.

Home attendance

Turner Field

Truist Park

(*) – There were no fans allowed in any MLB stadium in 2020 due to the COVID-19 pandemic.

Radio and television

The Braves regional games are exclusively broadcast on Bally Sports Southeast. Brandon Gaudin is the play-by-play announcer for Bally Sports Southeast. Gaudin is joined in the booth primarily by Jeff Francoeur. Tom Glavine will join the broadcast for 35 to 40 games. Paul Byrd, Brian Jordan and Peter Moylan also appear in the booth as in-game analysts.

The radio broadcast team is led by the tandem of play-by-play announcer Ben Ingram and analyst Joe Simpson. They work the bulk of the games, with Jim Powell joining Simpson or Ingram throughout the season. Braves games are broadcast across Georgia and seven other states on at least 172 radio affiliates, including flagship station 680 The Fan in Atlanta and stations as far away as Richmond, Virginia; Louisville, Kentucky; and the US Virgin Islands. The games are carried on at least 82 radio stations in Georgia.

References

Footnotes

Citations

Further reading

External links

 
 Team index page at Baseball Reference
 Milwaukee Braves informational website
 Sports Illustrated Atlanta Braves Page
 ESPN Atlanta Braves Page
 History of the Boston Braves on MassHistory.com

 
Major League Baseball teams
Grapefruit League
Liberty Media subsidiaries

19th century in Boston
Baseball teams in Boston
Baseball teams established in 1876
1876 establishments in Massachusetts
Former Time Warner subsidiaries
Baseball teams in Georgia (U.S. state)